Eddie Benjamin Vines (April 27, 1918 – June 9, 1992) was an American Negro league first baseman in the 1940s.

A native of Tuscaloosa, Alabama, Vines played for the Birmingham Black Barons in 1940. He died in Pontiac, Michigan in 1992 at age 74.

References

External links
 and Seamheads

1918 births
1992 deaths
Birmingham Black Barons players
Baseball first basemen
Baseball players from Alabama
Sportspeople from Tuscaloosa, Alabama
20th-century African-American sportspeople